The 2008 Trophée Éric Bompard was the fourth event of six in the 2008–09 ISU Grand Prix of Figure Skating, a senior-level international invitational competition series. It was held at the Palais omnisports de Paris-Bercy in Paris on November 13–16. Medals were awarded in the disciplines of men's singles, ladies' singles, pair skating, and ice dancing. Skaters earned points toward qualifying for the 2008–09 Grand Prix Final. The compulsory dance was the Paso Doble.

Results

Men
Patrick Chan won his second Grand Prix title.

Ladies

Pairs
During the free skating, Meagan Duhamel accidentally sliced Craig Buntin's hand a minute into the program on their side-by-side salchow jumps and blood dripped on the ice; the pair stopped to get his hand bandaged and then completed the program to win the bronze medal.

Ice dancing

References

External links

 
 
 
 
 
 

Trophée Éric Bompard, 2008
Trophee Eric Bompard
Trophée Éric Bompard
Trophée Éric Bompard
Internationaux de France
Trophée Éric Bompard
International figure skating competitions hosted by France